TSG Entertainment Finance LLC (d.b.a. TSG Entertainment) is an American film financing entity which primarily funds live action films. TSG stands for parent company The Seelig Group.

TSG was established after the U.S. theatrical release of Parental Guidance to replace Dune Entertainment as a result of Dune not renewing their deal with 20th Century Fox. Fox was looking for a new long term co-financing arrangement and made a deal with TSG Entertainment. The financing entity was founded by former Dune partner Chip Seelig with majority funding from Magnetar Capital with additional funding from Seelig and others. Seelig had left Dune in May 2011 to launch a new funding company. TSG was also looking for some ($300–400 million) debt financing from banks at this time. In November 2015, Bona Film Group, a Chinese film studio, invested $235 million in TSG. Because of The Walt Disney Company’s acquisition of 21st Century Fox (sans certain units) on March 20, 2019, Disney inherited Fox’s deal with TSG for 20th Century Fox (now 20th Century Studios).

TSG's logo is a depiction of a man with a bow shooting an arrow through several axe heads, similar to Odysseus from Homer's Odyssey.

Films

2013 

 The Secret Life of Walter Mitty
 The Book Thief
 Baggage Claim
 The Counselor
 Black Nativity
 The Heat
 The Wolverine
 A Good Day to Die Hard
 Enough Said
 Percy Jackson: Sea of Monsters
 The Way Way Back
 The Internship
 Trance

2014

 Belle
 The Drop
 Wild
 Let's Be Cops
 Devil's Due
 The Other Woman
 Dawn of the Planet of the Apes
 The Fault in Our Stars
 X-Men: Days of Future Past
 Night at the Museum: Secret of the Tomb
 Gone Girl
 Birdman or (the Unexpected Virtue of Ignorance)
 The Grand Budapest Hotel
 Exodus: Gods and Kings
 Kingsman: The Secret Service

2015

 Far from the Madding Crowd
 Taken 3
 Alvin and the Chipmunks: The Road Chip
 Bridge of Spies
 The Second Best Exotic Marigold Hotel
 The Longest Ride
 Demolition
 Joy
 The Martian
 Poltergeist

2016 

 The Other Side of the Door
 Deadpool
 X-Men: Apocalypse
 Independence Day: Resurgence
 Miss Peregrine's Home for Peculiar Children
 Hidden Figures
 Absolutely Fabulous: The Movie

2017
 Table 19
 Logan
 Diary of a Wimpy Kid: The Long Haul
 Alien: Covenant
 War for the Planet of the Apes
 My Cousin Rachel
 Patti Cake$
 Goodbye Christopher Robin
 The Shape of Water
 Kingsman: The Golden Circle
 The Greatest Showman

2018

 Maze Runner: The Death Cure
 Deadpool 2
 The Darkest Minds
 The Predator
 Bad Times at the El Royale
 Bohemian Rhapsody

2019

 The Kid Who Would Be King
 The Aftermath
 Dark Phoenix (TSG's first film after the Disney-Fox merger)
 Ready or Not
 Ad Astra
 Lucy in the Sky 
 Jojo Rabbit  
 Terminator: Dark Fate
 Ford v Ferrari

2020

 Underwater
 Downhill 
 The Call of the Wild
 Wendy
 The New Mutants
 The Empty Man

2021
 Nomadland 
 Free Guy
 The Night House
 The Eyes of Tammy Faye
 The Last Duel
 Ron's Gone Wrong (TSG's first animated film)
 Antlers
 West Side Story
 Nightmare Alley

2022 
 Death on the Nile
 Where the Crawdads Sing (TSG's first collaboration with Sony Pictures Entertainment)
 The Invitation
 Bullet Train
 The Woman King
 See How They Run
 Lyle, Lyle, Crocodile
 The Banshees of Inisherin
 The Menu
 Empire of Light
 Avatar: The Way of Water
  Whitney Houston: I Wanna Dance with Somebody
  A Man Called Otto

2023 
   Missing
  65

References

External links 
 

20th Century Studios
Film production companies of the United States
Mass media companies established in 2013
Mass media companies based in New York City
Disney acquisitions
Disney production studios